Preloge pri Šmarju is a small settlement near Šmarje pri Jelšah in eastern Slovenia. The area is part of the historical Styria region and the entire Municipality of Šmarje pri Jelšah is now included in the Savinja Statistical Region.

Name
The name of the settlement was changed from Preloge to Preloge pri Šmarju in 1953.

References

External links
Preloge pri Šmarju at Geopedia

Populated places in the Municipality of Šmarje pri Jelšah